Waqlamarka (local Quechua waqla (waqra) horn, marka settlement / storey, "horn village", hispanicized spelling Hacjlasmarca) is an archaeological site with walls and round burial towers (chullpa) in Peru. It is situated in the Junín Region, Jauja Province, Parco District.

See also 
 Hatunmarka
 Tunanmarka

References 

Archaeological sites in Peru
Archaeological sites in Junín Region
Tombs in Peru